Katete is a small town in western Uganda in the District of Mbarara just across the River Rwizi. It is in the Nyamitanga Division.

Populated places in Western Region, Uganda
Mbarara District